The Summer Cup was a Scottish football competition open to teams in the top division, first of the wartime Southern League from 1940 to 1945 and then of the Scottish League from 1963 to 1965.

History 
When the competition was first introduced in 1940 it was organised by the Southern League and was one of two wartime cup competitions run by the League, along with the Southern League Cup. The competition ran from May to June, when the league season had already finished. It was discontinued after 1945. 

Just as the one-off Scottish War Emergency Cup of 1940 was a predecessor of sorts to the wartime Summer Cup, the 1946 Victory Cup could be seen as its successor due to the similar format used, although the trophy actually used for the Victory Cup was that of the Southern League Cup, which did have a 1946 edition completed a few weeks earlier.

The Summer Cup was reintroduced in 1963 as a national cup competition for Scottish Football League Division One clubs because running costs for clubs in the top division were getting more expensive. Both Celtic and Rangers declined to take part in either season the competition was played.

The trophy currently resides in the boardroom at Easter Road, the home of Hibernian. Hibs chairman Harry Swan had helped to establish the competition and, when Hibernian won the first final, team manager Willie McCartney suggested that the trophy should be presented to him; Swan's family subsequently gifted the trophy to Hibernian in perpetuity.

List of Finals

Southern League 

1Rangers won the final and the cup on a Coin Toss after a goalless draw and 2 corners each.

Scottish Division One

Performance by club

References

Defunct football cup competitions in Scotland
Scottish Football League
Wartime football in Scotland
Recurring sporting events established in 1940
Recurring sporting events disestablished in 1945
Recurring sporting events established in 1963
Recurring sporting events disestablished in 1965
1940 establishments in Scotland
1945 disestablishments in Scotland
1963 establishments in Scotland
1965 disestablishments in Scotland